Hasitha Nirmal (born 28 July 1992) is a Sri Lankan cricketer. He made his List A debut for Polonnaruwa District in the 2016–17 Districts One Day Tournament on 25 March 2017. He made his Twenty20 debut for Sri Lanka Police Sports Club in the 2017–18 SLC Twenty20 Tournament on 25 February 2018.

References

External links
 

1992 births
Living people
Sri Lankan cricketers
Kalutara Town Club cricketers
Polonnaruwa District cricketers
Sri Lanka Police Sports Club cricketers
Sri Lanka Air Force Sports Club cricketers
Cricketers from Colombo